Herrgott is a surname. Notable people with the surname include:

Élizabeth Herrgott (1941–2021), French writer
François Joseph Herrgott (1814–1907), French surgeon and obstetrician 
Marquard Herrgott (1694–1762), German Benedictine historian and diplomat

See also
Hergot